Shoal Lake 34B1 is a First Nations reserve at the southwestern end of Shoal Lake in Kenora District, Ontario. It is one of the reserves of the Animakee Wa Zhing 37 First Nation.

References

External links
 Canada Lands Survey System

Anishinaabe reserves in Ontario
Communities in Kenora District